Sandrach is a 51 km long river of Bavaria, Germany. It flows into the Paar near Manching.

See also
List of rivers of Bavaria

References

Rivers of Bavaria
Rivers of Germany